Why Worry may refer to:

Film and TV
 Why Worry?, a 1923 Harold Lloyd film

Music
Why Worry, a 1986 album by Nana Mouskouri

Songs
"Why Worry?" (Clannad song), a 1991 single
"Why Worry Blues" by Jack Prentice (words) and Bud Shepard, George Webb and Vic Sell (music) for the silent film Why Worry?
"Why Worry", a 1952 song by The Andrews Sisters
"Why Worry", a 1952 single by Eddie "Piano" Miller
"Why Worry", a 1967 song by Aaron Neville Davis, Diamond
"Why Worry", a 1973 single by The Africans
"Why Worry", a 1977 single by Israel Vibration
"Why Worry", a 1985 song by Dire Straits from the album Brothers in Arms
"Why Worry", a song by Johnny Maddox And The Rhythmasters
"Why Worry", a 2002 song by The All-American Rejects from the album The All-American Rejects
"Why Worry", a 2020 song by Isaiah Rashad